The 1949 North Dakota State Bison football team was an American football team that represented North Dakota Agricultural College (now known as North Dakota State University) in the North Central Conference (NCC) during the 1949 college football season.  In its second and final season under head coach Howard Bliss, the team compiled a 0–9 record (0–6 against NCC opponents) and finished in seventh/last place out of seven teams in the NCC. The team played its home games at Dacotah Field in Fargo, North Dakota.

Schedule

References

North Dakota Agricultural
North Dakota State Bison football seasons
College football winless seasons
North Dakota Agricultural Bison football